Luther Dean "Ticky" Burden (February 28, 1953 – October 29, 2015) was an American NBA and ABA basketball player.

High school
Born in Haines City, Florida, Burden attended Albany, New York's Philip Schuyler High School, where he was a member of the basketball team.

College
Burden attended the University of Utah. He played for the United States men's national basketball team in the 1974 FIBA World Championship, winning the bronze medal and scoring 20.2 points per game, a Team USA record which was overtaken by Kevin Durant in 2010. In 1975, his junior year, he averaged 28.7 points per game and set the Western Athletic Conference record for field goals in a season with 359.

Professional basketball
Following his junior season, he was allowed to turn pro as a hardship case. Burden was drafted by the Virginia Squires of the American Basketball Association and the New York Knicks of the National Basketball Association. He chose Virginia, but left after one season, during which he had a serious argument with coach Bill Musselman. Upon joining the Knicks, he stated "In Virginia I saw the bad side of pro basketball, in New York I know I'll see the good side". In the 1976–77 season, Burden got into 61 games for the Knicks in a backup role, averaging 10 minutes and 5.7 points per game. However, in the 77–78 season Knicks coach Willis Reed became frustrated with Burden's lack of defensive play, and sent him to the disabled list for the remainder of the season after he played in just two games. Reed unsuccessfully attempted to trade Burden, but ending up placing him on waivers and releasing him following the season.

Legal trouble
On July 3, 1980, Burden and three other men allegedly robbed a bank in Hempstead, Long Island. Burden was convicted after the three other men struck deals and testified against him, and was given a sentence of six to eighteen years. After serving two years, Burden's conviction was overturned when a court ruled that detectives did not possess search or arrest warrants when they raided Burden's home. Burden would later plead guilty to receiving stolen money in conjunction with the robbery, but was released after being given credit for time served.

Later life
As of 2010, Burden was working with the YWCA organization, mentoring and coaching basketball. Since 2012, Burden experienced medical problems related to ATTR amyloidosis. He died in Winston-Salem, North Carolina on October 29, 2015, after developing a fever following cataract surgery.

External links

References

1953 births
2015 deaths
African-American basketball players
All-American college men's basketball players
American men's basketball players
American people convicted of theft
American sportspeople convicted of crimes
Basketball players from Florida
New York Knicks draft picks
New York Knicks players
People from Haines City, Florida
Shooting guards
Sportspeople from Polk County, Florida
United States men's national basketball team players
Utah Utes men's basketball players
Virginia Squires draft picks
Virginia Squires players
20th-century African-American sportspeople
21st-century African-American people
1974 FIBA World Championship players